John A. Fredrickson is a member of the Nebraska Legislature for District 20 from Omaha, Nebraska. He was elected to the Nebraska Legislature on November 8, 2022, by a margin of only 82 votes. He is the first openly gay man to be elected to the state legislature.

Electoral history

References

Democratic Party Nebraska state senators
21st-century American politicians
Living people
Year of birth missing (living people)
New York University alumni
Columbia University alumni
Politicians from Omaha, Nebraska
LGBT state legislators in Nebraska
Gay politicians